Michael Noer (born 21 March 1969) is an American business writer and editor who has worked for Forbes magazine and Wired Magazine, and is currently the executive news editor for Forbes.com.

Career
Noer graduated cum laude from Rice University in 1992, the year before he became a Thomas J. Watson Fellow and spent 15 months traveling through Europe and the Middle East studying the history of Santa Claus.

As a reporter for Forbes, Noer worked on the Forbes 400 list, and in 1996 was the founding managing editor of Forbes.com. In a piece written by Adam Penenberg under Noer's tenure, the site uncovered the journalistic fraud of New Republic reporter Stephen Glass, a scoop that is widely considered a landmark moment for internet journalism and inspired the 2003 film Shattered Glass. From 1999 to 2000 Noer served as Business editor of Wired, where he edited the Wired 40.

After returning to Forbes.com, he helped create the Forbes Fictional 15, for which he wrote a satiric look at the business practices of Santa Claus. The Fictional 15 has included Thurston Howell III and Tony Stark among others and continues to this day as more and more characters have been added to the list. He also edited a variety of features for the site, including a look at the greatest athletic achievements of all time,
 as well as special reports on communicating, money, and work.

Sexism controversy
On 22 August 2006, Forbes.com published Noer's article Don't Marry Career Women, which included statistics used to defend a thesis that men were unhappier in marriages in which the women earned more than $30,000 a year, as opposed to marriages in which the women worked less. Due to the controversy the article sparked among readers and bloggers, it was taken down after only one day. Hours later, it was republished with a counterpoint piece entitled Don't Marry A Lazy Man, by Elizabeth Corcoran, a Forbes senior editor based in Silicon Valley. Forbes simultaneously opened up a reader response forum to discuss the issues raised by the two articles, and Steve Forbes, the magazine's editor-in-chief and leading shareholder, issued a public apology.

References

American magazine editors
Living people
Watson Fellows
1969 births
Rice University alumni